Meritxell Serret Aleu (born 19 June 1975) is a Spanish politician from Catalonia, and the former Minister of Agriculture, Livestock, Fisheries and Food of the Generalitat of Catalonia.

Life and career 
Serret was born in Vallfogona of Balaguer, Catalonia, Spain. She has a degree in Political Sciences and Administration from the Autonomous University of Barcelona and has additional degrees in General Management from the Open University of Catalonia. She speaks four languages: Spanish, English, French and Catalan.

In her career, Serret has held a managerial position for Provedella, a centre that promotes beef, has been in charge of organizational tasks in the Unió de Pagesos (Farmers Union), and as a technical coordinator for the Fundació del Mon Rural (Rural World Foundation).

She has been president of the Cultural Association The Xop of Vallfogona of Balaguer since 2009.

Serret was councillor of the City council of Vallfogona of Balaguer as an independent for Republican Left of Catalonia.

As an activist she has been a member of the national secretariat and coordinator of the political incidence committee of the Catalan National Assembly.

On January 13, 2016, Serret was appointed Minister of Agriculture, Livestock, Fisheries and Food by the President of the Catalan Government, Carles Puigdemont. She was sworn in on January 14.

Serret moved to Belgium with Carles Puigdemont and three other Catalan ex-ministers after the declaration of independence of Catalonia. She returned to Spain in 2021.

References 

1975 births
Agriculture ministers of Catalonia
Autonomous University of Barcelona alumni
Fisheries ministers of Catalonia
Living people
Members of the 12th Parliament of Catalonia
Women members of the Parliament of Catalonia
People barred from public office